"Long Live Love" is a song by Australian singer, songwriter and actress Olivia Newton-John, released in 1974. It was the  entrant to the Eurovision Song Contest 1974 in Brighton, United Kingdom.

Background
The song's composers, Valerie Avon and Harold Spiro, had worked together as staff writers for Belwin Mills Publishing since 1970 and had placed songs with several artists: Newton-John had recorded the Avon/Spiro composition "Don't Move Away" as a duet with Cliff Richard, the track serving as B-side to Richard's 1971 hit "Sunny Honey Girl".

A Song For Europe

Newton-John introduced one of each of the six nominated songs on a broadcast of Jimmy Savile's Clunk Click TV show; on 23 February 1974 a TV broadcast entitled A Song For Europe 1974 announced the tally of viewers' mailed-in ballots, with "Long Live Love" the clear victor at 27,387 votes. The runner-up, "Angel Eyes" - which was Newton-John's favourite - gained 18,018 votes.

Newton-John made recorded versions of all the songs she had performed for UK Eurovision 1974 consideration, these tracks making up half of Long Live Love, a December 1974 Olivia Newton-John album release, with "Angel Eyes" being utilized as the B-side of the single release of "Long Live Love."

At Eurovision
Considered a strong contender for Eurovision 1974, "Long Live Love" was performed second on the night of the final (following 's Carita Holmström singing "Keep Me Warm" and preceding 's Peret with "Canta y sé feliz"). The conductor for the number was Nick Ingman and Newton-John was backed by a five-woman chorale which included the Ladybirds, the trio who had sung backup for Sandie Shaw on her victorious performance of "Puppet on a String" at Eurovision 1967.

Newton-John admitted post-contest: "I was never really happy with the song I had to sing."

"Long Live Love" was succeeded as British representative at the 1975 contest by The Shadows with "Let Me Be the One". Olivia Newton-John would be the last solo act to represent the UK at Eurovision until Eurovision 1985.

On 10 August 2022, Eurovision’s official YouTube channel uploaded the song’s performance from 1974 contest in Brighton in tribute to Olivia after her death.

Chart performance
In the British Isles "Long Live Love" charted in the UK with a #11 peak and reached #9 in Ireland: the track also afforded Newton-John a #11 hit in her adopted homeland of Australia. In anticipation of a boost from its expected strong Eurovision showing, "Long Live Love" was widely released throughout mainland Europe with the track having its highest global impact in Norway with a three-week chart peak tenure at #3, being kept from #1 by the chart-topping 1974 Eurovision victor "Waterloo" (ABBA) with first "Devil Gate Drive" (Suzi Quatro) and then "Seasons in the Sun" (Terry Jacks) at #2. However "Long Live Love" did not afford Newton-John widespread European success, otherwise charting only on Belgium's Dutch chart (#7) and in Finland (#9).

Charts

Weekly charts

Year-end charts

Cover versions
Newton-John herself recorded a German-language version of "Long Live Love", while renderings in Norwegian and Finnish were recorded by respectively  ("Det er et sted") and Päivi Paunu ("Kun rakastaa").. Anthony Newley covered the song and it was issued as a single (MGM M12744) in the U.S. in 1974

References

External links
 

1974 singles
Eurovision songs of 1974
Eurovision songs of the United Kingdom
Olivia Newton-John songs
Songs written by Harold Spiro
Songs written by Valerie Murtagh
Pye Records singles
1974 songs